Sub communione is an ecclesiastical term referring to the music played during the Eucharist according to liturgics.

Examples
Samuel Scheidt, Psalmus Sub Comunione: Jesus Christus, Unser Heiland 
Johannes Sebastian Bach, Jesus Christus, unser Heiland sub Communione, BWV 665

References

Eucharist